The thirteenth series of the British semi-reality television programme The Only Way Is Essex was confirmed on 30 January 2014 when it had been announced that it had renewed for a further three series, the eleventh, twelfth and thirteenth. It is therefore the final series to be included in its current contract. The series launched on 8 October 2014 with two The Only Way Is Ibiza specials. It is the first series to feature on ITV's new channel ITVBe, which also launched on 8 October 2014. Because of this, the first episode of The Only Way Is Ibiza features a live afterparty straight after the episode hosted by ex-cast member Mark Wright and narrator of the show Denise van Outen.

Cast

Episodes

{| class="wikitable plainrowheaders" style="width:100%; background:#fff;"
! style="background:#0056A6;"| Seriesno.
! style="background:#0056A6;"| Episodeno.
! style="background:#0056A6;"| Title
! style="background:#0056A6;"| Original air date
! style="background:#0056A6;"| Duration
! style="background:#0056A6;"| UK viewers

|}

Reception

Ratings

References

The Only Way Is Essex
2014 British television seasons